Musa (minor planet designation: 600 Musa) is a minor planet orbiting the Sun.

References

External links 
 
 

000600
Discoveries by Joel Hastings Metcalf
Named minor planets
000600
19060614